The men's 10,000 metres at the 2010 World Junior Championships in Athletics was held at the Moncton 2010 Stadium on 20 July. A field of 20 athletes from 14 countries competed.

Medalists

Records
Prior to the competition, the existing world junior and championship records were as follows.

No new records were established during the competition.

Results
20 July

Key:  DNF = Did not finish, NJR = National junior record, PB = Personal best, SB = Seasonal best, WJL = World junior leading

Participation
According to an unofficial count, 20 athletes from 14 countries participated in the event.

References

External links
10,000 metres results from IAAF. IAAF. Retrieved on 2010-07-21.
13th IAAF World Junior Championships Facts & Figures. IAAF. Retrieved on 2010-07-21.

10,000 metres
Long distance running at the World Athletics U20 Championships